Facing Evil with Candice DeLong is an American documentary television series on Investigation Discovery that debuted on November 25, 2010, as a two-part special, which later turned into a full series. Facing Evil is hosted by former FBI Profiler Candice DeLong as she visits different women's prisons and talks with female prisoners. At the end, she states whether or not she believes that someone is being truthful about what they're saying.

Episodes

Season 1 (2010)

Season 2 (2011)

Season 3 (2012)

Season 4 (2013-14)

See also
Deadly Women
Snapped
Wives with Knives

References

2010 American television series debuts
2010s American documentary television series
2014 American television series endings
English-language television shows
Investigation Discovery original programming